The Cable Car is a cocktail created in 1996 by Tony Abou-Ganim. A modern variant on the classic Sidecar, it commemorates the Starlight Room in the Drake Hotel in San Francisco. 

The recipe varies, but generally involves (specifically) Captain Morgan Spiced Rum, orange Curaçao, and lemon sour, garnished with a cinnamon-sugared rim.

Carb free variant "Cablegram": 1 1/2 oz whiskey, 1/2 oz lemon juice, 1/2 tsp splenda shaken with ice. Pour in high ball glass topped with 4 oz diet ginger ale. Garnish with lemon

Notes

Cocktails with rum